Hoppin' John, also known as Carolina peas and rice, is a peas and rice dish served in the Southern United States. It is made with cowpeas (mainly, Black-eyed peas, Sea Island red peas in the Sea Islands and Iron and clay peas in the Southeast US) and rice, chopped onion, and sliced bacon, seasoned with salt. Some recipes use ham hock, fatback, country sausage, or smoked turkey parts instead of bacon. A few use green peppers or vinegar and spices. Smaller than black-eyed peas, field peas are used in the South Carolina Lowcountry and coastal Georgia; black-eyed peas are the norm elsewhere.

In the southern United States, eating Hoppin' John on New Year's Day is thought to bring a prosperous year filled with luck. The peas are symbolic of pennies or coins, and a coin is sometimes added to the pot or left under the dinner bowls.  Collard greens, mustard greens, turnip greens, chard, kale, cabbage and similar leafy green vegetables served along with this dish are supposed to further add to the wealth, since they are the color of American currency. Another traditional food, cornbread, can also be served to represent wealth, being the color of gold. On the day after New Year's Day, leftover "Hoppin' John" is called "Skippin' Jenny" and further demonstrates one's frugality, bringing a hope for an even better chance of prosperity in the New Year.

Etymology 

The Oxford English Dictionary'''s first reference to the dish is from Frederick Law Olmsted's 19th century travelogue, A Journey in the Seaboard Slave States (1861). A recipe for "Hopping John" in The Carolina Housewife by Sarah Rutledge, which was published in 1847, is also cited as the earliest reference. An even earlier source is Recollections of a Southern Matron, which mentions "Hopping John" (defined, in a note, as "bacon and rice") as early as 1838. The origins of the name are uncertain; one possibility is that the name is a corruption of the Haitian Creole term for black-eyed peas: pois pigeons, or "pigeon peas" in English.

History
Hoppin' John was originally a Lowcountry food before spreading to the entire population of the South. Hoppin' John may have evolved from  rice and bean mixtures that were the subsistence of enslaved West Africans en route to the Americas. Hoppin' John has been further traced to similar foods in West Africa, in particular the Senegalese dish thiebou niebe''.

One tradition common in the United States is that each person at the meal should leave three peas on their plate to ensure that the New Year will be filled with luck, fortune and romance. Another tradition holds that counting the number of peas in a serving predicts the amount of luck (or wealth) that the diner will have in the coming year. On Sapelo Island in the community of Hog Hammock, Geechee red peas are used instead of black-eyed peas. Sea Island red peas are similar.

American chef Sean Brock claims that traditional Hoppin' John was made with Carolina Gold rice, once thought to be extinct, and Sea Island red peas. He has worked with farmers to re-introduce this variety of rice.  As of 2017, several rice growers offer Carolina gold rice.

Variants 
Other bean and rice dishes are seen in Southern Louisiana and in the Caribbean, and are often associated with African culinary influence in the Americas. Regional variants include the Guyanese dish "cook-up rice", which uses black-eyed peas and coconut milk; "Hoppin' Juan," which substitutes Cuban black beans for black-eyed peas; the Peruvian tacu-tacu; and the Brazilian dish baião-de-dois, which also often uses black-eyed peas.

See also

 Arroz de fríjol cabecita negra - the Colombian equivalent.
 Arroz con gandules - the Puerto Rican equivalent
 Gallo pinto - the equivalent dish of Nicaragua and Costa Rica
 List of regional dishes of the United States
 Pabellón criollo - A similar dish in Venezuela including shredded beef and where ingredients are served separately
 Platillo Moros y Cristianos - the Cuban equivalent
 Red beans and rice
 Saint Sylvester's Day - a similar dish is eaten in Italy to celebrate the New Year.

References

External links
 How to make Hoppin' John

Legume dishes
Lowcountry cuisine
American rice dishes
Bacon dishes
New Year foods
Soul food
Cuisine of the Southern United States